A mobile dial code (MDC) is a grouping of 3 to 10 numbers following either a "#" "##" "*" "**" used to create a short, easy to remember phone number. Historically MDCs were used for repair related purposes by landline and wireless carriers. More recently MDCs have been made available for commercial use. MDCs are dialed just like a regular telephone number. Businesses can send automatic responses upon contact, such as by text message.

Usage

MDCs are used by wireless carriers for the following purposes:

 customer convenience, offering quick access to customer service or bill payment;

 diagnosing problems with and making repairs, such as to unlock or lock cell phones.

 For commercial use by third parties as a vanity telephone number.

For a MDC to be used as a vanity telephone number, it must be provisioned to its user by all of the major wireless carriers. If the business needs to use to the MDC in more than one State, accommodations can be made for one MDC to be shared by multiple users on a state by state, or even local area by local area basis through advanced routing technology, called geo-routing. Inbound calls to MDCs can either be automatically routed based upon the area code of the caller, or by asking the caller to type out speak their zip code into the phone.

Commercial use

MDCs may be easier to remember than full phone numbers, and thus easier to brand. They may be useful to lead generation businesses that generate and then sell leads for potential business to other companies.

Similar technology

USSD (Unstructured Supplementary Service Data) codes are mobile dial codes that can be used for communicating with the service provider's computers (i.e. for WAP browsing, prepaid callback service, mobile-money services, location-based content services, menu-based information services, and as part of configuring the phone on the network).

Abbreviated dialing codes involve a similar technology that supports only voice calls.

A 2D bar code involves the use of a graphic that must be photographed or scanned by a mobile phone camera prior to presenting the caller with a response.

Worldwide

United States

In the United States, each wireless network controls how their MDCs will be used. As such, when wireless customers call a MDC, they're call is routed to the end user that their carrier selects.

See also 

 Abbreviated dialing
 Vertical service code, consisting of an asterisk followed by a two-digit number.
 Short code, for sending SMS and MMS text messages
 Comparison of user features of messaging platforms

References 

North American Numbering Plan
Calling features
Telephone numbers